Limbdi railway station  is a railway station serving in Surendranagar district of Gujarat State of India. It is under Bhavnagar railway division of Western Railway Zone of Indian Railways. Passenger, Express and Superfast trains halt here.

Major trains 

The following trains halt at Limbdi railway station in both directions:

 12945/46 Surat - Mahuva Superfast Express
 12971/72 Bhavnagar Terminus - Bandra Terminus SF Express
 19579/80 Bhavnagar Terminus - Delhi Sarai Rohilla Link Express

See also
Bhavnagar State Railway

References

Railway stations in Surendranagar district
Bhavnagar railway division